Woy Woy Bay is a suburb located in the Central Coast region of New South Wales, Australia, as part of the  local government area. Most of the suburb's area belongs to the Brisbane Water National Park, although a small community on Woy Woy Bay (part of Brisbane Water) containing a community hall, public reserve and wharf is also located within the suburb. Woy Woy Bay is commonly used by boaters on the weekend because of the open expanses of the bay. The main thoroughfare is Taylor Street.

Notable residents
 Belinda Neal (1963-), former politician: Australian House of Representatives (2007–2010); New South Wales Legislative Council (1994–1998) and Gosford City Council Alderman (1992–1994).
 John Della Bosca (1956-), former politician: New South Wales Legislative Council 1999–2010.

References

Suburbs of the Central Coast (New South Wales)
Bays of New South Wales